Ciobanu is a Romanian surname, common in Romania and Moldova. Notable persons with the surname include:

 Ghenadie Ciobanu (born 1957), Moldovan politician
 Gheorghe Ciobanu (1909–1995), Romanian ethnomusicologist and Byzantine specialist
 Gheorghe Ciobanu (21st century), Moldovan politician
 Ilarion Ciobanu (1931–2008), Romanian actor
 Ion Constantin Ciobanu (1927–2001), Moldovan writer
 Maia Ciobanu (born 1952), Romanian composer
 Mihaela Ciobanu (born 1973), Romanian-Spanish handball player
 Nelly Ciobanu (born 1974), Moldovan singer
 Radu Ciobanu (born 1975), Romanian footballer
 Sebastian Ciobanu (born 1985), Romanian kickboxer
 Ștefan Ciobanu (born 1979), Romanian footballer
 Ștefan Ciobanu (1883–1950), Bessarabian and Romanian politician
 Vitalie Ciobanu (born 1964), Moldovan journalist
 Vladimir Ciobanu (born 1953), Moldovan politician

Occupational surnames
Romanian-language surnames